Tomás Herrera is the name of:

 Tomás de Herrera (1804–1859), Central and South American statesman and general
 Tomás Herrera Martínez (1950–2020), Cuban basketball player
 Tomás Herrera (baseball)
 Tomás Herrera (ranchero) - Nuevo Mexico born immigrant to Alta California.